Magar may refer to:

Magar people
Magar language
Khagendra Thapa Magar, the shortest man in the world (as of 2012)
Magar, the Catholicos of All Armenians from 1885 to 1891

See also
 Magyar (disambiguation)

Language and nationality disambiguation pages